Naservand (also Romanized as Nāşervand; also known as Nausarwān) is a village in Koregah-e Sharqi Rural District, in the Central District of Khorramabad County, Lorestan Province, Iran. At the 2006 census, its population was 852, in 169 families.

References 

Towns and villages in Khorramabad County